Bikashnagar is a small village of Rairangpur city in Mayurbhanj district in the state of Odisha, India.

Geography 

References

Mayurbhanj district